David Wills may refer to:
 Dave Wills (sportscaster) (1964–2023), American sportscaster; radio voice of the Tampa Bay Rays
 David Wills (voice actor) (born 1970), American voice actor
 David Wills (musician) (born 1954), American musician; co-founder of the band Negativland
 David Wills (singer) (born 1951), American country music singer-songwriter
 David Wills (Gettysburg) (1831–1894), instigator of the Gettysburg National Cemetery and Lincoln's Gettysburg Address
 David Wills (writer) (born 1953), American professor of French and translator; author of Prosthesis
 Dave Wills (baseball) (1877–1959), Major League Baseball first baseman 
 David S. Wills (writer) (born 1985), Scottish author of books on the Beat Generation and Hunter S. Thompson
 Sir David Wills (philanthropist) (1917–1999), English soldier and philanthropist; creator of the Ditchley Foundation

See also  
 David Willis (disambiguation)